The 25th Day of December is a  Christmas album by American singer Bobby Darin, released in 1960.

Reception

In his Allmusic review, critic Dennis MacDonald praised the American spirituals included on the album but wrote "On the hymns, however, Darin is lost in syrupy arrangements."

Track listing
All songs Traditional unless otherwise noted.
"O Come All Ye Faithful" (Frederick Oakeley, John Reading, John Francis Wade) – 2:25
"Poor Little Jesus" (Paul Campbell, Ronnie Gilbert, Lee Hays, Fred Hellerman, Pete Seeger, Traditional) – 3:03
"Child of God" – 2:03
"Baby Born Today" – 1:30
"Holy Holy Holy" – 2:47
"Ave Maria"  – 4:00
"Go Tell It on the Mountain" (John Wesley Work, Jr., Traditional)  – 1:54
"While Shepherds Watched Their Flocks"  – 2:12
"Jehovah Hallelujah"  – 2:16
"Mary, Where Is Your Baby?"  – 1:50
"Silent Night, Holy Night" (Franz Gruber, Joseph Mohr) – 3:51
"Dona Nobis Pacem" – 1:52
"Amen" – 0:58
"Christmas Auld Lang Syne" (Manny Kurtz, Frances Philip Military) – 2:43

Personnel
Bobby Darin – vocals
Bill Putnam – engineer
Bobby Scott – arranger, conductor

References

Bobby Darin albums
1960 Christmas albums
Albums produced by Ahmet Ertegun
Atco Records albums
Christmas albums by American artists
Pop Christmas albums